Mkwawa is an administrative ward in the Iringa Urban district of the Iringa Region of Tanzania. In 2016 the Tanzania National Bureau of Statistics report there were 10,122 people in the ward, from 9,673 in 2012.

Neighborhoods 
The ward has 15 neighborhoods.

 Bwawani "A"
 Bwawani 'B'
 Don Bosco 'A'
 Don Bosco 'B'
 Hoho
 Ikonongo 'A'
 Ikonongo 'B'
 Imalanongwa A
 Imalanongwa B
 Itamba
 Lukosi
 Mgera
 Mkwawa Chuo
 Wazo 'A'
 Wazo 'B'

References 

Wards of Iringa Region